Bisantius, also spelled Byzantius, Byzantios, Bisanctus, Vyzantios or Visantius, was a masculine given name of Greek origin.
Byzantius (archbishop of Bari), ruled from 1025 until 1035
Bisantius I (archbishop of Trani), ruled from 1063 until 1100
Bisantius II (archbishop of Trani), ruled from 1100 until 1126
Bisantius III (archbishop of Trani), ruled from 1142 until 1150
Bisantius (bishop of Bisceglie), ruled from 1182 until 1220, previously abbot of Santa Maria de Columna
Bisantius (abbot of Santa Sofia di Benevento), ruled from 1033 until 1052
Bisantius Guirdeliku (late 11th century), leader of a municipal faction in Bari
Byzantios (  1175–1200), Swedish sculptor